Lightning is an atmospheric discharge of electricity.

Lightning or Lightnin may also refer to:

Computing 
 Lightning (connector), a power and data bus for Apple iPhone, iPod, and iPad products
 Lightning (software), an extension that adds calendar and scheduling functionality to the Mozilla Thunderbird e-mail client
 GNU lightning, a library for just-in-time compilation
 Lightning Network, the blockchain payment protocol
 Lightning, a public front end to the Salesforce.com platform

Film and television
 [[Lightnin' (1925 film)|Lightnin (1925 film)]], a comedy by John Ford
 Lightning (1925 film), a German silent drama film
 Lightning (1927 film), an American film of 1927
 [[Lightnin' (1930 film)|Lightnin''' (1930 film)]], an American Pre-Code comedy film
 Lightning (1952 film), a film by Mikio Naruse
 Lightning, a bloodhound in Racing Stripes Lightning (dog), a German shepherd who appeared in various 1930s films
 Lightning (Tom and Jerry), an orange cat in the Tom and Jerry cartoons
 Lightning, a BBC Two television quiz show hosted by comedian Zoe Lyons

 Firearms 
 Colt Lightning Carbine, a rifle manufactured between 1884 and 1904
AMT Lightning pistol
AMT Lightning 25/22 rifle

Literature
 Lightning (novel), a 1988 novel by Dean Koontz
 Lightning, a 1984 87th Precinct novel by Ed McBain
 [[Lightnin' (play)|Lightnin (play)]], a 1918 play
 Lightning (DC Comics) (Jennifer Pierce), a DC Comics superhero 
 Lightning, one of the superpowered brothers Thunder and Lightning
 Lightning, a member of the Tower Comics T.H.U.N.D.E.R. Agents

 Military 
 Lockheed P-38 Lightning, an American fighter aircraft of World War II
 Lockheed Martin F-35 Lightning II, a US/UK fighter aircraft, the Joint Strike Fighter
 HMS Lightning (1806), a Thais-class fireship
 HMS Lightning (1829), an 18-gun sloop
 HMS Lightning (1876), a torpedo boat
 HMS Lightning (1895), a Janus-class destroyer
 HMS Lightning (G55), a 1940 L-class destroyer
 English Electric Lightning, a supersonic British fighter aircraft of the Cold War era
 Advising Platform Lightning, a military base in Afghanistan operated by NATO
 78th Infantry Division (United States) or Lightning

Music
 Lightning Records, a record label founded in the 1970s
 Lightning (album), a 2012 album by Matt & Kim
 "Lightning" (song), a 2011 song by The Wanted
 "Lightning", a song by Little Mix from Get Weird "Lightning", a song by Charli XCX from Crash "Lightning", a song by Eric Church from Sinners Like Me "Lightning", a song by Counting Crows, one of the "Flying Demos"
 "Lightning", a song by Supernaut

People
Nickname
 Lightnin' Chance (1925–2005), American session musician Floyd Chance
 Lightnin' Hopkins (1912–1982), American country blues singer, songwriter, and guitarist Sam John Hopkins
 Lightnin' Slim (1913–1974), African-American blues musician Otis V. Hicks
 René Hall (1911–1988), nicknamed Lightnin', American jazz banjoist
 Steve Krulevitz (born 1951), American tennis player

Stage name or ring name
 Jeff Farmer (wrestler) or Lightning, American professional wrestler
 Lightning (Gladiators) or Kim Betts (born 1971), English bodybuilder and a star of the UK version of Gladiators Lightning (wrestler), Puerto Rican professional wrestler
 Lightning, professional wrestler from the Gorgeous Ladies of WrestlingSurname
 Cody Lightning (born 1986), Cree Native American actor
 Crystle Lightning (born 1981), American/Canadian actress and musician
 Georgina Lightning, Canadian First Nations film director, screenwriter and actress, mother of Crystle and Cody Lightning
 Royston Lightning, Australian rugby league player 

Places
 Lightning (Atlanta), a former neighborhood of Atlanta, Georgia, United States
 Lightning Peak (disambiguation), several mountain peaks in Canada and the United States
 Lightning Lake, British Columbia, Canada

 Sports 
 Australia 
 Adelaide Lightning, a Women's Basketball League team
 Lightning Stakes, a thoroughbred horse race
 Pine Hills Lightning, a Greater Brisbane League baseball club

 Ireland 
 Drogheda Lightning, a defunct American football team (2010–2015)
 Leinster Lightning, a provincial cricket team

 United Kingdom 
 Guildford Lightning, a Women's Premier League ice hockey team in Guildford, Surrey
 Lancashire Lightning, the name for the Lancashire County Cricket Club during one-day matches
 Lightning (women's cricket), a women's cricket team based in the East Midlands
 Loughborough Lightning (disambiguation), several teams in Loughborough, Leicestershire

 United States 
 Buffalo Lightning, former name (1998-2005) of the Buffalo Jr. Sabres Junior "A" ice hockey team from Buffalo, New York
 Carolina Lightnin', a defunct American Soccer League team (1981–1984)
 Colorado Lightning, a Professional Arena Soccer League founded in 2008
 Dallas Lightning, a defunct United Soccer Leagues W-League team (1993–1996)
 Detroit Lightning, a Major Indoor Soccer League franchise for the 1979–1980 season
 Los Angeles Lightning, a professional basketball team in the Independent Basketball Association
 Louisville Lightning, a Professional Arena Soccer League team founded in 2008
 Minnesota Lightning, a women's United Soccer Leagues W-League team
 Oklahoma City Lightning, a full-contact American football team in the Women's Spring Football League
 Rockford Lightning, a defunct Continental Basketball League franchise
 Stockton Lightning, a defunct indoor football team (2006–2010)
 Tampa Bay Lightning, a National Hockey League ice hockey franchise
 West Coast Lightning, a Women's Football Alliance expansion team

 Other countries 
 London Lightning, a Canadian professional basketball team based in London, Ontario
 Tel Aviv Lightning, an Israel Baseball League franchise

 Transportation 
 Aircraft 
 Beechcraft Lightning, an experimental civilian turboprop aircraft
 Sport Copter Lightning, American autogyro

 Automotive 
 Lightning Car Company, a British company that builds electric sports cars
 Lightning GT, the flagship vehicle of the aforementioned car company
 Ford Lightning (disambiguation), three pickup trucks made by Ford Motor Company
 BSA Lightning, a motorcycle produced by BSA between 1965 and 1972

 Rail 
 Lightning Route, an early tram service in Montgomery, Alabama, United States
 Lightning, a GWR Iron Duke Class locomotive on the Great Western Railway from 1847 to 1878
 Lightning, one of the GWR 3031 Class locomotives built for and run on the Great Western Railway between 1891 and 1915

 Ships and boats 
 Lightning (clipper), a clipper ship built by Donald McKay in 1854
 Lightning (dinghy), a 19-foot one-design sloop-rigged sailing dinghy designed in 1938 for three-man class racing

Other uses
 Lightning (Entertainment City), a roller coaster at Entertainment City in Kuwait
 Lightning (Revere Beach), a roller coaster that formerly operated at Revere Beach in Revere, Massachusetts
 Lightning (Final Fantasy), the female protagonist from Final Fantasy XIII Lightning, a game mode in Bejeweled 3 Lightning Spell, a spell found in the 2012 strategy game Clash of Clans Lightning, the horse of the mythical American cowboy Pecos Bill
 Lightning, the mascot of Middle Tennessee State University

See also
 HMS Lightning, a list of Royal Navy ships
 Lightning (comics), a list of comics characters
 Lightning Comics (disambiguation)
 Lightning McQueen, a character in Cars'' and its sequels, played by Owen Wilson
 Like Lightning (disambiguation)
 Operation Lightning (disambiguation)
 Litening, a targeting pod for attack aircraft